"Fly" is a song by German power metal band Blind Guardian and the second single from their 2006 album A Twist in the Myth. Two of the songs are from the album ("Fly" and "Skalds and Shadows"), with the latter being an acoustic version only available on the single. The single also includes a cover of Iron Butterfly's "In-A-Gadda-Da-Vida", also available only on the single.

Vocalist Hansi Kürsch has said that while "Fly" is a surprising title for a Blind Guardian song, it fits very well with the lyrics. He added, "This song is about inspirations and how they can influence your art, your life and other people's lives. I, myself, was inspired by the movie Finding Neverland when doing the lyrics."

Track listing 

 "Fly" – 5:46
 "Skalds and Shadows" (Acoustic Version) – 3:15
 "In-A-Gadda-Da-Vida" (Iron Butterfly cover) – 3:37

Personnel

 Hansi Kürsch - vocals
 André Olbrich - guitar
 Marcus Siepen - guitar
 Frederik Ehmke - drums

Charts 
#178 Japan
#4 Spain
#4 Hungary
#29 Sweden
#32 Germany
#52 Austria
#94 Switzerland

External links 
 Charts
 News update detailing the single and album

2006 singles
Blind Guardian songs
Songs written by Hansi Kürsch
Songs written by André Olbrich
2006 songs
Nuclear Blast Records singles